The Western Sanitary Commission was a private agency based in St. Louis that was a rival of the larger U.S. Sanitary Commission. It operated in the west during the American Civil War to help the U.S. Army deal with sick and wounded soldiers. It was led by abolitionists and focused on the needs of Freedmen.

It was founded in St. Louis August 1861 under the protection of General John C. Frémont and under the leadership of Reverend William Greenleaf Eliot (1811–1887) and James E. Yeatman (1818–1901). Its first mission was to care for the wounded from the Battle of Wilson's Creek. In its first six weeks it established four large general hospitals with over two thousand beds. It later set up convalescent facilities. A major activity was acquiring adequate stocks of medicines and medical supplies for the hospitals run by the U.S. Army.  Working with Dorothea Dix it took charge of finding women to be civilian nurses and nurses' aides in Army facilities.

The Western Sanitary Commission generally handled all sanitary affairs west of the Mississippi, and operated on a budget of $50,000 a month (about one-fourth the size of the rival national organization).  The money came from private fundraising in the city of St. Louis, as well as from donors in California and New England. Parrish explains it selected nurses, provided hospital supplies, set up several hospitals, and outfitted several hospital ships. It also provided clothing and places to stay for freedmen and refugees, and set up schools for black children. It continued to finance various philanthropic projects until 1886.

See also
Missouri in the American Civil War
United States Sanitary Commission

Notes

Further reading
 Bender, Robert Patrick."'This Noble and Philanthropic Enterprise': The Mississippi Valley Sanitary Fair of 1864 and the Practice of Civil War Philanthropy," Missouri Historical Review 95 (January 2001): 117–139 online edition
 Parrish, William E. "The Western Sanitary Commission," Civil War History, March 1990, Vol. 36 Issue 1, pp 17–35
 Rosecrans, W. S.  "Annual Report of the Western Sanitary Commission for the Years Ending July, 1862, and July, 1863"; "Circular of Mississippi Valley Sanitary Fair, to Be Held in St. Louis, May 17th, 1864" The North American Review, Vol. 98, No. 203 (Apr., 1864), pp. 519–530 in JSTOR
 Stillé, Charles J. History of the United States Sanitary Commission, Being the General Report of Its Work during the War of the Rebellion (1866), online

American Civil War hospitals
United States Sanitary Commission
Hospital ships
Missouri in the American Civil War